Davor Krznarić (born 22 August 1975) is a Croatian former footballer who played as a midfielder.

Club career
At the end of the 1995–96 season, Krznarić made two substitute appearances for Borussia Mönchengladbach in the Bundesliga.

International career
Krznarić made three appearances for the Croatia national under-21 football team.

References

External links
 

1975 births
Living people
Footballers from Berlin
Association football midfielders
Croatian footballers
Croatia under-21 international footballers
Tennis Borussia Berlin players
Borussia Mönchengladbach players
Borussia Mönchengladbach II players
Berliner FC Dynamo players
SV Babelsberg 03 players
1. FC Lokomotive Leipzig players
Bundesliga players
2. Bundesliga players
Croatian expatriate footballers
Expatriate footballers in Germany
Croatian expatriate sportspeople in Germany